This is a list of awards and nominations received by the singer-songwriter and musician Van Morrison. He first came to prominence in 1964 as the frontman of the band Them, for which he wrote the garage rock classic "Gloria". As a solo performer he wrote and recorded the pop hit song "Brown Eyed Girl"  in 1967. As of 2010, he has recorded and released thirty-three studio albums and six live albums, winning many prestigious awards and nominations in the process. He was ranked number 27 on Acclaimed Music's list of The Top 1000 Artists of All Time.

Academy Awards
The Academy Awards are presented annually by the Academy of Motion Picture Arts and Sciences and celebrates artistic and technical merit in the film industry. Morrison was nominated for "Down to Joy", from the movie Belfast.

|-
|  2022
| "Down to Joy"
| Best Original Song 
| 
|}

Americana Music Honors & Awards
The Americana Music Honors & Awards are presented annually by the Americana Music Association and celebrates distinguished members of the Americana music community. Americana music encompasses a wide variety of roots genres including rock and roll, country, folk, r&b and blues. The ceremony features several "of the year" awards and five lifetime achievement honors among others.

|-
|  2017
| Van Morrison
| Lifetime Achievement Award for Songwriting
| 
|}

Grammy Awards
The Grammy Awards are presented annually by the National Academy of Recording Arts and Sciences of the United States for outstanding achievements in the music industry.  Morrison has been nominated for a Grammy Award for five songs, winning the award for two of them. Two albums have received a nomination.

|-
|  1982
| "Scandinavia"
| Best Rock Instrumental Performance
| 
|-
|  1988
| "Irish Heartbeat"
| Best Traditional Folk Recording
| 
|-
| 1994
| "In the Garden"/ "You Send Me"/"Allegeny
| Best Rock Vocal Performance - Male
| 
|-
| 1995
| "Have I Told You Lately That I Love You?"
| Best Pop Collaboration With Vocals
| 
|-
| 1997
| "Don't Look Back"
| Best Pop Collaboration With Vocals
| 
|-
| 1998
| "Shenandoah"
| Best Pop Collaboration With Vocals
| 
|-
| 2004
| What's Wrong with This Picture?
| Best Contemporary Blues Album
| 
|}

Grammy Hall of Fame
The Grammy Hall of Fame is a special Grammy award established in 1973 to honour recordings that are at least twenty-five years old and that have "qualitative or historical significance." Two albums and two songs by Morrison were inducted into the Grammy Hall of Fame, three in 1999 and one in 2007.

|-
|rowspan="3"| 1999
|| Astral Weeks
|rowspan="4"|Grammy Hall of Fame
| 
|-
|| "Gloria"
| 
|-
|| Moondance
| 
|-
|| 2007
|| "Brown Eyed Girl"
| 
|-

Brit Awards
Brit Awards are held annually and were created by the British Phonographic Industry. Morrison has been nominated 8 times, receiving  1 award for "Outstanding Contribution".

|-
| 1990
| "Van Morrison"
| Best British Male
| 
|-
| rowspan="2"|1991
| "Van Morrison"
| Best British Male
| 
|-
| Enlightenment
| Best British Album
| 
|-
| 1992
| "Van Morrison"
| Best British Male
| 
|-
| rowspan="2"|1994
| "Van Morrison"
| Best British Male
| 
|-
| "Van Morrison"
| Outstanding Contribution
| 
|-
| 1996
| "Van Morrison"
| Best British Male
| 
|-
| 2000
| "Van Morrison"
| Best British Male
| 
|-

Rock and Roll Hall of Fame
The Rock and Roll Hall of Fame which held its first induction ceremony in 1986 inducts a handful of artists into the Hall of Fame in an annual induction ceremony. Groups or individuals are qualified for induction 25 years after the release of their first record. Nominees should have demonstrable influence and significance within the history of rock and roll. Morrison was inducted 26 years after his first solo hit single, "Brown Eyed Girl".

|-
| 1993
| "Van Morrison"
| Rock and Roll Hall of Fame
| 
|-

Songwriters Hall of Fame
The Songwriters Hall of Fame, an arm of the National Academy of Popular Music, was founded in 1969 and holds an annual induction ceremony in New York City. Morrison was inducted in 2003.

|-
| 2003
| "Van Morrison"
| Songwriters Hall of Fame
| 
|-

Irish Music Hall of Fame
The Irish Music Hall of Fame opened in 1999 and recognised what it described as the best of Irish musical talent of all types over the decades. Morrison was the first musician to be inducted.

|-
| 1999
| "Van Morrison"
| Irish Music Hall of Fame
| 
|-

BMI ICON Award
The BMI ICON Awards were established in 2002 by Broadcast Music Incorporated to recognize the "unique and indelible influence on generations of music makers". Morrison was given the award in 2004.

|-
| 2004
| "Van Morrison"
| BMI ICON Award
| 
|-

Ivor Novello Awards
The Ivor Novello Awards are presented annually in London by the British Academy of Composers and Songwriters. Morrison received an award in 1995.

|-
| 1995
| "Van Morrison"
| Lifetime Achievement Award
| 
|-

Q Awards
The Q Awards are awarded annually by Q magazine. Morrison won an award in 1995.

|-
! 1995
| "Van Morrison"
| Songwriter
| 
|-

Mercury Prize
The Mercury Prize is an annual music prize awarded for the best album from the United Kingdom and Ireland. It was established by the British Phonographic Industry and British Association of Record Dealers. One of Morrison's albums was nominated in 1995.

|-
| 1995
| Days Like This
| Album of the Year
| 
|-

Rock and Roll Hall of Fame's 500 Songs that Shaped Rock and Roll
The Rock and Roll Hall of Fame's 500 Songs that Shaped Rock and Roll is an unordered list of 500 songs that they believe have been most influential in shaping the course of rock and roll.  Three of Morrison's songs are on the listing.

|-
| 
| "Brown Eyed Girl"
| The Rock and Roll Hall of Fame's 500 Songs that Shaped Rock and Roll
| selected
|-
| 
| "Madame George"
| The Rock and Roll Hall of Fame's 500 Songs that Shaped Rock and Roll
| selected
|-
| 
| "Moondance"
| The Rock and Roll Hall of Fame's 500 Songs that Shaped Rock and Roll
| selected
|-

Other awards and lists of greatests

Morrison is critically acclaimed  to be one of the greatest artists in music history and has often appeared in numerous well-known "greatest" lists: VH1 (25), Rolling Stone (42), WXPN (14) and Paste (20). His voice was also voted in some lists to be one of the greatest in music: Q (20) and Rolling Stone (24). Time included the albums Moondance and Astral Weeks on its list. On the Rolling Stone list, Moondance was ranked number 65 and Astral Weeks at number 19. In 2004, Rolling Stone published a list of The 500 Greatest Songs of All Time, voted on by numerous musical artists and music critics. Three of Morrison's songs were included and ranked: "Moondance" (226), "Gloria" (208) (with Them) and "Brown Eyed Girl" (109). In 2010, Rolling Stone released an updated list, which including more songs from the 21st century; "Into the Mystic", from the album Moondance, was added and ranked at number 474.

References 
Footnotes

Bibliography

Rogan, Johnny (2006). Van Morrison: No Surrender, London: Vintage Books 
Turner, Steve (1993). Van Morrison: Too Late to Stop Now, Viking Penguin,

External links 
 

Van Morrison
Awards